Hardin Charles Cox, Jr. (March 4, 1928 – March 8, 2013) was an American politician, businessman, and writer.

Born in Rock Port, Missouri, Cox served in the United States Army in 1945-1946 and then during the Korean War. He then graduated from University of Missouri in Columbia, Missouri and was owner of an insurance business. He also wrote a newspaper column for the local newspaper the 'Atchison County Mail.' He served on the Atchison County Commission. Cox also served in the Missouri House of Representatives 1965-1975 and the Missouri State Senate 1975-1983 as a Democrat. He died in Rock Port, Missouri.

Notes

1928 births
2013 deaths
People from Rock Port, Missouri
University of Missouri alumni
Businesspeople from Missouri
Writers from Missouri
Democratic Party members of the Missouri House of Representatives
Democratic Party Missouri state senators
20th-century American businesspeople